This article lists important figures and events in the public affairs of British Malaya during the year 1936, together with births and deaths of prominent Malayans.

Incumbent political figures

Central level 
 Governor of Federated of Malay States :
 Shenton Whitelegge Thomas
 Chief Secretaries to the Government of the FMS :
 Marcus Rex (until unknown date)
 Federal Secretaries of the Federated of Malay States :
 Christopher Dominic Ahearne (from unknown date)
 Governor of Straits Settlements :
 Shenton Whitelegge Thomas

State level 
  Perlis :
 Raja of Perlis : Syed Alwi Syed Saffi Jamalullail
  Johore :
 Sultan of Johor : Sultan Ibrahim Al-Masyhur
  Kedah :
 Sultan of Kedah : Abdul Hamid Halim Shah
  Kelantan :
 Sultan of Kelantan : Sultan Ismail Sultan Muhammad IV
  Trengganu :
 Sultan of Trengganu : Sulaiman Badrul Alam Shah
  Selangor :
 British Residents of Selangor : Theodore Samuel Adams 
 Sultan of Selangor : Sultan Sir Alaeddin Sulaiman Shah 
  Penang :
 Monarchs : 
 King George V (until 20 January)
 King Edward VIII (20 January – 11 December) 
 King George VI (from 11 December)
 Residents-Councillors :  Arthur Mitchell Goodman
  Malacca :
 Monarchs : 
 King George V (until 20 January)
 King Edward VIII (20 January – 11 December) 
 King George VI (from 11 December)
 Residents-Councillors :
  Negri Sembilan :
 British Residents of Negri Sembilan : John Whitehouse Ward Hughes 
 Yang di-Pertuan Besar of Negri Sembilan : Tuanku Abdul Rahman ibni Almarhum Tuanku Muhammad 
   Pahang :
 British Residents of Pahang : C. C. Brown
 Sultan of Pahang : Sultan Abu Bakar
  Perak :
 British Residents of Perak : G. E. Cater
 Sultan of Perak : Sultan Iskandar Shah

Events 
 18 February – Football Association of Selangor established.
 22 February – Selangor FA was founded.
 Unknown date – The enactment of Penal Code.

Births
 19 January – Sidek Abdullah Kamar – Badminton player (died 2005)
 21 May – Abdul Taib Mahmud – Former 4th Chief Minister of Sarawak (1981–2014)
 16 November – Elyas Omar, politician (died 2018)

Deaths

See also
 1936
 1935 in Malaya
 1937 in Malaya
 History of Malaysia

References

1930s in British Malaya
Malaya